Plainfield is a town on the northwestern edge of Hampshire County, Massachusetts, United States, about 25 miles east of Pittsfield and 30 miles northwest of Northampton.  The population was 633 at the 2020 census. It is part of the Springfield, Massachusetts Metropolitan Statistical Area.

History 

Plainfield was first settled in 1770, primarily by settlers from the town of Bridgewater, and was officially incorporated as a district within the Town of Cummington in 1785, and as a town on June 15, 1807.  Plainfield is the youngest town in Hampshire County.

In the 1800s, Plainfield was a thriving agricultural community, primarily producing sheep and leather for tanning. With the widespread adoption of the steamship, and the resultant globalization in the 1870s, the expense of importing both mutton and leather from Australia and New Zealand was greatly reduced. Consequently, the agricultural industries in Plainfield became less profitable, and the population declined substantially over the following decades.

Sixty-one men from Plainfield joined the Union Army late in the American Civil War. Six were killed in battle, or died as a consequence of their service, including resident Michael Bashaw who died of dysentery at the battle of Wilson's Creek. Of those who survived, many settled elsewhere after the war.

After over a century of population decline, modern Plainfield has experienced population growth since 1950.

Geography
The Town of Plainfield is situated in the scenic Berkshire Highlands where Hampshire County merges into neighboring Franklin and Berkshire Counties. Plainfield is part of the Hilltowns of Western Massachusetts.

Plainfield sits 1620′ above sea level, and the peaks of West Mountain (at 2125′) are the highest elevation in Hampshire County.

Plainfield's waterways serve as the headwaters of the Westfield and Deerfield rivers.

Plainfield is bordered by the towns of Cummington, Ashfield, Hawley, Savoy, and Windsor.

Demographics

As of the census of 2000, there were 589 people, 243 households, and 166 families residing in the town. There were 311 housing units at an average density of 14.8 per square mile (5.7/km). The racial makeup of the town was 98.13% White, 0.34% Native American, 0.17% Asian, and 1.36% from two or more races. Hispanic or Latino of any race were 0.68% of the population.

There were 243 households, out of which 31.3% had children under the age of 18 living with them, 60.9% were married couples living together, 4.5% had a female householder with no husband present, and 31.3% were non-families. Of all households, 25.9% were made up of individuals, and 10.3% had someone living alone who was 65 years of age or older.  The average household size was 2.42 and the average family size was 2.92.

In the town, the population was spread out, with 24.8% under the age of 18, 4.2% from 18 to 24, 26.1% from 25 to 44, 31.9% from 45 to 64, and 12.9% who were 65 years of age or older.  The median age was 42 years. For every 100 females, there were 94.4 males.  For every 100 females age 18 and over, there were 99.5 males.

The median income for a household in the town was $37,250, and the median income for a family was $46,042. Males had a median income of $31,625 versus $26,875 for females. The per capita income for the town was $20,785.  About 4.8% of families and 8.0% of the population were below the poverty line, including 4.9% of those under age 18 and none of those age 65 or over.

Government
Plainfield is governed by a Town Meeting open to all registered voters in the town. Ongoing town matters are managed by an elected Board of Selectmen and other Boards and Commissions.  The town is part of the First Hampshire District in the Massachusetts House of Representatives, represented by Lindsay Sabadosa, and the Berkshire, Franklin, and Hampshire Senate district, represented by Adam G. Hinds.

Notable people

 Erastus Newton Bates, Illinois and Minnesota legislator
 John Brown (1800–1859), abolitionist who played a role in starting the Civil War
 William Cullen Bryant (1794–1878), poet, philosopher
 Ralph Ellison, novelist, essayist.  African-American novelist, literary critic, scholar and writer
 Martha J. Lamb, author, historian
 Charles McCarry (born 1930), author of more than ten novels and numerous works of non-fiction
 James Naismith, inventor of basketball
 Talcott Seelye, former United States Ambassador to Tunisia and Syria, Arabist
 Charles Dudley Warner, born in Plainfield on September 12, 1829, author, editor Hartford Courant
 Marcus Whitman (1802–1847), missionary physician

Points of interest
 Deer Hill State Reservation
 Dubuque Memorial State Forest
 Shaw Hudson House; museum and historical home of note
 Old Millers site; one of eight mills on the Old Mill stream; Plainfield Historical Society.

References

External links

 Town of Plainfield official website
 Plainfield Volunteer Fire Department
 Plainfield Historical Society

 
Springfield metropolitan area, Massachusetts
Towns in Hampshire County, Massachusetts
Towns in Massachusetts